Jacobus Dirk (Koos) Hertogs (The Hague, 16 December 1949 – Vught, 19 July 2015) was a convicted Dutch serial killer. He was convicted for a total of three murders.

Victims 
 Tialda Visser, 12 years old, was reported missing on 11 May 1979, after she didn't return home after ballet classes at the Royal Conservatory of The Hague. Four days later, on 15 May, her lifeless body was found near the Leeghwaterbrug in The Hague. The cause of death could not be determined.
 Emy den Boer, 18 years old, disappeared on 3 April 1980. She left her home in Schiedam to go to the Academie voor Lichamelijke Opvoeding in The Hague, however she never got there. Two days later, on 5 April, her body was found by a hiker in the forest near Nistelrode. She was shot in the stomach and head.
 Edith Post, 11 years old, disappeared while at school on 29 September 1980. She left her class to get some materials from a closet in the hallway but didn't return. On 2 October her body was found in the dunes of Wassenaar. She was beaten to death, probably with a branch that was found next to her body.

Private life 

Hertogs was in a homosexual relationship with Cornelis Stolk, Vice President of the court in The Hague.

Arrest 
After the murder on Edith Post, the police received an anonymous call with the information that Edith had bitten her murderer, and a bouncer of nightclub "De Nachtegaal" (The Nightingale) had a severe bite wound on his little finger. The bouncer, who was subsequently arrested, turned out to be Koos Hertogs. Police searched his house and found traces of blood matched to Tialda Visser and Emy den Boer. In the attic, police found an insulated room. It is believed that Hertogs hid and raped his victims here for a period of time, before killing them. Hertogs was sentenced to life imprisonment. Until 1989 Hertogs denied killing the girls. However, after consultation with his lawyer he confessed so he could be placed on a lighter regime.

Sting operation 
For a long time there were rumors that Hertogs had protection from high-level individuals. In the book Zuidwal, that tells the story of the serial killer, it is claimed that Hertogs was protected by Cornelis Stolk, an important judge and vice president of the court, however both men denied the claims. In 2009 crime reporter Peter R. de Vries started a sting operation, trying to reveal if Hertogs murdered more people or if the claims made in the book were true. While being filmed with hidden cameras, Hertogs, talking with a 'dear' friend, who turned out to be an infiltrator working for De Vries, made some notable admissions.

 He admitted he kidnapped and murdered the three girls.
 With the murder of Edith Post he had an accomplice.
 Three times he had plans to murder someone, however the plans weren't carried out or failed.
 Claimed a man he planned to kill who he had an argument with fled inside a pool hall before Hertogs could kill him.
 Claimed he planned to kill a director of a juvenile prison, however the man died before Hertogs could carry out his plan.
 Hertogs lured and inmate into a trap, however a guard got suspicious and locked him up.
 Confessed knowing who murdered the two Swedish women, Gun-Ingeborg Johannesson (18) and Ann Jönsson (19), in a forest near La Roche-en-Ardenne.
 Confessed he had a special bond with judge Cornelis Stolk. Stolk paid for the driver's license of Hertogs and after an earlier conviction Stolk placed him under the care of a 'befriended' psychiatrist, who later turned out to be the ex-wife of Stolk. In the end of the television show it was revealed that Hertogs, in return, offered sexual services (oral sex) and child pornography to Cornelis Stolk. Mr. Cornelis Stolk died on 10 June 2004, aged 87.

Book De zaak Koos H.
In August 2012 writer and psychologist Patrick Oomens published the book De zaak Koos H., in which he questions the claim that Hertogs is a serial killer and concludes that he does not fit the profile. According to Oomens, that would shed light on the case and claims that the case of Hertogs has characteristics of a cover-up with connections to Operation Gladio. 
With respect to the 'befriended' psychiatrist, the writer claims to have discovered that the ex-wife of Stolk wasn't a psychiatrist at all, but in reality the first female pilot in the Netherlands who transported the Dutch Royal family in the early 1950s.

See also
List of serial killers by country
List of serial killers by number of victims

References 
 
 
 Patrick Oomens: De confidente – de 'psychiater'– van rechter Stolk, 22 February 2013 (in Dutch)
 Beruchte seriemoordenaar Koos Hertogs (65) overleden, Algemeen Dagblad, 22 July 2015 (in Dutch)

1949 births
2015 deaths
20th-century Dutch criminals
21st-century Dutch criminals
Dutch people convicted of murder
Dutch people who died in prison custody
Dutch prisoners sentenced to life imprisonment
Dutch rapists
Dutch serial killers
Male serial killers
People convicted of murder by the Netherlands
Prisoners sentenced to life imprisonment by the Netherlands
Prisoners who died in Dutch detention
Serial killers who died in prison custody
Violence against women in the Netherlands